Pinus cooperi, sometimes called Cooper's pine or Cooper pine, is a medium-sized pine which is endemic to Mexico.

References

cooperi
Flora of Mexico
Plants described in 1950
Flora of the Sierra Madre Occidental